Sunner (Punjabi: ਸੁੰਨੜ) is a Punjabi Jatt got or clan found in the Punjab region of India,

Sunner villages of Punjab 
 Sunner Kalan (Jalandhar District)
 Sunner Khurd (Jalandhar District)
 Sunran Rajputan (Kapurthala District - near Phagwara)
 Rampur Sunra (Kapurthala District - near Phagwara)
 Sunrawala (Kapurthala District)

References 

Surnames of Indian origin